Jack Daniel Kalichi Lahne (born 24 October 2001) is a Swedish professional footballer who plays as striker for Norwegian First Division club Start, on loan from  club Amiens.

Club career

Brommapojkarna
Jack made his senior debut for Brommapojkarna at the age of 15 in a Svenska Cupen game against Norrköping in March 2017. Lahne made his Superettan debut for Brommapojkarna during Summer 2017. He scored his first goal for Brommapojkarna in a Superettan game against Åtvidabergs in July 2017, making him Brommapojkarna's youngest ever goalscorer at the age of 15 years and 271 days. At the end of the 2017 Superettan season, Brommapojkarna won promotion to Allsvenskan.

During the 2018 Allsvenskan season, Jack Lahne scored 4 goals in 19 games as Brommapojkarna were relegated back to Superettan after losing in the relegation playoffs against AFC Eskilstuna, in which Lahne scored one goal.

Amiens
In January 2019, Lahne joined Amiens on loan until the end of the 2018–19 Ligue 1 season. On deadline day, 4 April 2019, however, the loan deal was converted to a permanent transfer, before Lahne had had the chance to play for Amiens.

Lahne scored his first Ligue 1 goal for Amiens in a game against Montpellier on 30 November 2019, which was also his debut.

Loan to AIK 
On 4 April 2019, the same day SC Amiens purchased Lahne, it was announced the club had agreed to loan Lahne to reigning Allsvenskan champions AIK until 31 July 2019. Lahne made his Allsvenskan debut for AIK on 8 April 2019, coming on as a substitute for Saku Ylätupa in a 0–0 draw against IFK Norrköping. On 14 April 2019 in an Allsvenskan game against IK Sirius, Lahne scored his first goal for AIK in a 2–1 win. On 1 July 2019, Amiens exercised their option to end Lahne's loan deal with AIK prematurely.

Loan to Örebro 
On 28 February 2020, Lahne joined Örebro SK on loan until the summer of 2020. He made his competitive debut for Örebro in a 2019–20 Svenska Cupen game against IF Elfsborg in February 2020. He played in 10 Allsvenskan games without scoring before returning to Amiens on 31 July 2020.

Loan to Häcken 
On 4 March 2021, Lahne joined Häcken on loan for the 2021 Allsvenskan season.

Loan to Újpest 
On 28 July 2022, Lahne signed for Hungarian club Újpest on loan.

Loan to Start 
In February 2023, Lahne signed for Norwegian First Division club Start on loan for the 2023 season.

International career 
Lahne has made a total of 30 appearances for the Sweden U17 and U19 teams.

Personal life
He was adopted to Sweden from Zambia at an early age.

Career statistics

References

External links
 
 

2001 births
Living people
Sportspeople from Lusaka
Association football midfielders
Swedish footballers
Sweden youth international footballers
Zambian footballers
Swedish people of Zambian descent
Zambian emigrants to Sweden
Swedish adoptees
Superettan players
Allsvenskan players
Ligue 1 players
Championnat National 3 players
Ligue 2 players
First Professional Football League (Bulgaria) players
Second Professional Football League (Bulgaria) players
IF Brommapojkarna players
Amiens SC players
AIK Fotboll players
Örebro SK players
BK Häcken players
Botev Plovdiv players
Újpest FC players
IK Start players
Swedish expatriate footballers
Zambian expatriate footballers
Expatriate footballers in France
Swedish expatriate sportspeople in France
Zambian expatriate sportspeople in France
Expatriate footballers in Bulgaria
Swedish expatriate sportspeople in Bulgaria
Zambian expatriate sportspeople in Bulgaria
Expatriate footballers in Hungary
Swedish expatriate sportspeople in Hungary
Zambian expatriate sportspeople in Hungary
Expatriate footballers in Norway
Swedish expatriate sportspeople in Norway
Zambian expatriate sportspeople in Norway